The 1997 FIA GT Helsinki 3 Hours was the third race of the 1997 FIA GT Championship season.  It was run at a temporary street circuit in Helsinki, Finland on May 25, 1997, jointly with the Formula 3000.

Due to the upcoming of the LeMans 24 hours race, many teams opted not to participate in this event.  This included the factory Porsche, Lotus and Chrysler squads.

Official results
Class winners in bold.  Cars failing to complete 75% of winner's distance marked as Not Classified (NC).

Statistics
 Pole Position – #8 BMW Motorsport – 1:26.097
 Fastest Lap – #11 AMG-Mercedes – 1:27.901
 Distance – 359.341 km
 Average Speed – 119.420 km/h

External links
 World Sports Prototype Racing – Race Results

H
Helsinki 3 Hours
FIA GT 1997